Rose Lee Wai Mun is an Independent Non-executive Director of Swire She was the vice-chairman and chief executive officer of Hang Seng Bank.

References

Hong Kong bankers
Living people
Hang Seng Bank
Year of birth missing (living people)